Deep Gut Run is a stream in the U.S. state of West Virginia.

Deep Gut Run has a sharply defined course, hence the original name Deep Cut Run.

Variant names
According to the Geographic Names Information System, it has also been known historically as:
Deep Cut Run

Course
Deep Gut Run rises at New Manchester, in Hancock County and then flows southwest to join the Ohio River about 0.5 miles north-northwest of New Cumberland.

Watershed
Deep Gut Run drains  of area, receives about 37.6 in/year of precipitation, has a wetness index of 324.93, and is about 59% forested.

See also
List of rivers of West Virginia

References

Rivers of Hancock County, West Virginia
Rivers of West Virginia